Júnior César Moreira da Cunha (born 5 April 1985), also known as Juninho, is a Brazilian footballer who last played as a forward for Taubaté.

Career
Born in Goianápolis, Juninho played for Vila Nova on loan from Anápolis in 2007. In 2008, he joined Atlético Goianiense, on a 5-year contract.

Career statistics
(Correct )

Honours
Atlético Goianiense
Campeonato Brasileiro Série C: 2008
Campeonato Goiano: 2010

References

External links
ogol 

esportes.yahoo 

1985 births
Living people
Brazilian footballers
Campeonato Brasileiro Série A players
Atlético Clube Goianiense players
Clube Atlético Mineiro players
Association football forwards